Anoud Tower (Arabic: بُرْج ٱلْعَنُود) is a skyscraper in Riyadh, Saudi Arabia. It was completed in 2005. At 155 m high, it is a major commercial building on King Fahd road. It contains 20 floors with 3 basement levels. A twin tower is being completed alongside it. The tower is owned by Princess Al-Anoud Foundation and moderated by several Saudi Arabian companies including Alinma Bank Head Office & Novotel Hotels. The building design is based on a swordfish.

References

https://www.efpeurofacade.com/portfolio/al-anoud-tower-riyadh/

2005 establishments in Saudi Arabia
Buildings and structures completed in 2005
Skyscrapers in Riyadh
Skyscrapers in Saudi Arabia
Skyscraper office buildings in Saudi Arabia